Canvas is an extremely durable plain-woven fabric used for making sails, tents, marquees, backpacks, shelters, as a support for oil painting and for other items for which sturdiness is required, as well as in such fashion objects as handbags, electronic device cases, and shoes. It is popularly used by artists as a painting surface, typically stretched across a wooden frame.

Modern canvas is usually made of cotton or linen, or sometimes polyvinyl chloride (PVC), although historically it was made from hemp. It differs from other heavy cotton fabrics, such as denim, in being plain weave rather than twill weave. Canvas comes in two basic types: plain and duck. The threads in duck canvas are more tightly woven. The term duck comes from the Dutch word for cloth, doek.  In the United States, canvas is classified in two ways: by weight (ounces per square yard) and by a graded number system. The numbers run in reverse of the weight so a number 10 canvas is lighter than number 4.

The word "canvas" is derived from the 13th century Anglo-French canevaz and the Old French canevas. Both may be derivatives of the Vulgar Latin cannapaceus for "made of hemp", originating from the Greek  (cannabis).

For painting

Canvas has become the most common support medium for oil painting, replacing wooden panels. It was used from the 14th century in Italy, but only rarely. One of the earliest surviving oils on canvas is a French Madonna with angels from around 1410 in the Gemäldegalerie, Berlin. Its use in Saint George and the Dragon by Paolo Uccello in about 1470, and Sandro Botticelli's Birth of Venus in the 1480s was still unusual for the period.  Large paintings for country houses were apparently more likely to be on canvas, and are perhaps less likely to have survived. It was a good deal cheaper than a panel painting, and may sometime indicate a painting regarded as less important.  In the Uccello, the armour does not use silver leaf, as other of his paintings do (and the colour therefore remains undegraded).  Another common category of paintings on lighter cloth such as linen was in distemper or glue, often used for banners to be carried in procession. This is a less durable medium, and surviving examples such as Dirk Bouts' Entombment, in distemper on linen (1450s, National Gallery) are rare, and often rather faded in appearance.

Panel painting remained more common until the 16th century in Italy and the 17th century in Northern Europe. Mantegna and Venetian artists were among those leading the change; Venetian sail canvas was readily available and regarded as the best quality.

Canvas is usually stretched across a wooden frame called a stretcher and may be coated with gesso prior to being used to prevent oil paint from coming into direct contact with the canvas fibres which would eventually cause the canvas to decay. A traditional and flexible chalk gesso is composed of lead carbonate and linseed oil, applied over a rabbit skin glue ground; a variation using titanium white pigment and calcium carbonate is rather brittle and susceptible to cracking. As lead-based paint is poisonous, care has to be taken in using it. Various alternative and more flexible canvas primers are commercially available, the most popular being a synthetic latex paint composed of titanium dioxide and calcium carbonate, bound with a thermo-plastic emulsion.

Many artists have painted onto unprimed canvas, such as Jackson Pollock, Kenneth Noland, Francis Bacon, Helen Frankenthaler, Dan Christensen, Larry Zox, Ronnie Landfield, Color Field painters, Lyrical Abstractionists and others. Staining acrylic paint into the fabric of cotton duck canvas was more benign and less damaging to the fabric of the canvas than the use of oil paint.
In 1970 artist Helen Frankenthaler commented about her use of staining:
When I first started doing the stain paintings, I left large areas of canvas unpainted, I think, because the canvas itself acted as forcefully and as positively as paint or line or color. In other words, the very ground was part of the medium, so that instead of thinking of it as background or negative space or an empty spot, that area did not need paint because it had paint next to it. The thing was to decide where to leave it and where to fill it and where to say this doesn't need another line or another pail of colors. It's saying it in space.

Early canvas was made of linen, a sturdy brownish fabric of considerable strength. Linen is particularly suitable for the use of oil paint. In the early 20th century, cotton canvas, often referred to as "cotton duck", came into use. Linen is composed of higher quality material, and remains popular with many professional artists, especially those who work with oil paint. Cotton duck, which stretches more fully and has an even, mechanical weave, offers a more economical alternative. The advent of acrylic paint has greatly increased the popularity and use of cotton duck canvas. Linen and cotton derive from two entirely different plants, the flax plant and the cotton plant, respectively.

Gessoed canvases on stretchers are also available. They are prepared with two or three coats of gesso and are ready for use straight away. Artists desiring greater control of their painting surface may add a coat or two of their preferred gesso. Professional artists who wish to work on canvas may prepare their own canvas in the traditional manner.

One of the most outstanding differences between modern painting techniques and those of the Flemish and Dutch Masters is in the preparation of the canvas. "Modern" techniques take advantage of both the canvas texture as well as those of the paint itself. Renaissance masters took extreme measures to ensure that none of the texture of the canvas came through. This required a painstaking, months-long process of layering the raw canvas with (usually) lead-white paint, then polishing the surface, and then repeating. The final product had little resemblance to fabric, but instead had a glossy, enamel-like finish.

With a properly prepared canvas, the painter will find that each subsequent layer of color glides on in a "buttery" manner, and that with the proper consistency of application (fat over lean technique), a painting entirely devoid of brushstrokes can be achieved. A warm iron is applied over a piece of wet cotton to flatten the wrinkles.

Canvas can also be printed on using offset or specialist digital printers to create canvas prints. This process of digital inkjet printing is popularly referred to as Giclée. After printing, the canvas can be wrapped around a stretcher and displayed.

For embroidery
Canvas is a popular base fabric for embroidery such as cross-stitch and Berlin wool work.  Some specific types of embroidery canvases are Aida cloth (also called Java canvas), Penelope canvas, Chess canvas, and Binca canvas. Plastic canvas is a stiffer form of Binca canvas.

As a compound agent

From the 13th century onward, canvas was used as a covering layer on pavise shields. The canvas was applied to the wooden surface of the pavise, covered with multiple layers of gesso and often richly painted in tempera technique. Finally, the surface was sealed with a transparent varnish. While the gessoed canvas was a perfect painting surface, the primary purpose of the canvas application may have been the strengthening of the wooden shield corpus in a manner similar to modern glass-reinforced plastic.

Splined canvas, stretched canvas and canvas boards
Splined canvases differ from traditional side-stapled canvas in that canvas is attached with a spline at the rear of the frame. This allows the artist to incorporate painted edges into the artwork itself without staples at the sides, and the artwork can be displayed without a frame. Splined canvas can be restretched by adjusting the spline.

Stapled canvases stay stretched tighter over a longer period of time, but are more difficult to re-stretch when the need arises.

Canvas boards are made of canvas stretched over and glued to a cardboard backing, and sealed on the backside. The canvas is typically linen primed for a certain type of paint. They are primarily used by artists for quick studies.

Types
Dyed canvas
Fire-proof canvas
Printed canvas
Stripe canvas
Water-resistant canvas
Waterproof canvas
Waxed canvas
Rolled canvas

Products
Wood-and-canvas canoes (see photo of canvas being stretched on a canoe)
Bags, including coated canvas (e.g. Goyard)
Covers and tarpaulins
Shoes (e.g. Converse, Vans, Keds)
Tents
Martial arts uniforms (e.g. Tokaido, Shureido, Judogi)
Canvas Prints
Wrestling canvas, used in WWE and other Sports Entertainment promotions

See also
 Canvas print
 Eisengarn
 Marine canvas
 Plastic canvas
Salembaree

References

Gordon, Dillian, National Gallery Catalogues (new series): The Fifteenth Century Italian Paintings, Volume 1, 2003,

External links

Woven fabrics
Painting materials
Maritime culture

es:Lona
it:Interfodera
pl:Płótno
pt:Tela